is a 2001 Japanese film, written and directed by Shunji Iwai, that portrays the lives of 14-year-old students in Japan and the effect the enigmatic singer Lily Chou-Chou's music has on some of them.

The film is noted for an unconventional visual style which includes many jump cuts and shots with disjunctive contents, as well as for an elliptical narrative. These features, which have led the film to be described as restless or "explosive", are viewed by critics as efforts to artistically evoke the emotional lives of disaffected Japanese youth.

Critics mostly expressed positive views on All About Lily Chou-Chou. While some found the story's ambiguity frustrating, the film's lyricism drew praise.

Plot
All About Lily Chou-Chou follows two boys, Yūichi Hasumi and Shūsuke Hoshino from the start of junior middle school into the eighth grade. The film has a discontinuous storyline, starting midway through the story, just after the second term of junior high school begins, then flashes back to the first term and summer vacation, and then skips back to the present. 

Fourteen year-old Yuichi Hasumi runs a fan site and message board for Lily Chou-Chou, his favourite singer. Posting under the alias "Philia", he befriends another user named "Blue Cat". A shy and socially-outcast teenager, Yuichi is viciously bullied by his older classmate Shusuke Hoshino and his gang, who beat him and force him to publicly masturbate. The film flashes back to the previous year, where Shusuke is introduced as the academically-gifted class president who meets Yuichi at the school's kendo club. The pair become close friends, and Shusuke invites Yuichi to stay over at his house, introducing him to Lily Chou-Chou's music. Yuichi is moved by her music, joining her cult following. Back at school, he develops a crush on his classmate, Kuno.

On summer vacation, Shusuke, Yuichi, and their friends decide to take a trip to Okinawa. Once there, Shusuke has a traumatic near-death experience and his personality changes from good-natured to dangerous and manipulative. Returning to school in September, he takes his place as class bully and shows his newfound power by ruining the lives of his classmates. An alternative voice, that of the character Sumika Kanzaki, attributes Shusuke's personality change to the collapse of his family's business and his parents' divorce.

Yuichi finds himself sucked into his now-tormentor's gang. He is ridiculed and coerced into doing Shusuke's dirty work, and finds solace only in the ethereal music of Lily Chou-Chou and chatting with his online friends on his fan website. Things become far worse for everyone when Yuichi is assigned to supervising Shiori Tsuda, whom Shusuke has blackmailed into enjo kōsai. Kuno is raped by Shusuke's lackeys after unwittingly offending the school's girl gang. A guilt-ridden Yuichi lends Tsuda his copy of Lily Chou-Chou's album; she later dies by suicide. Yuichi, grieving, is talked out of suicide by Blue Cat in a series of online messages.

Yuichi heads to Tokyo to see a Lily Chou-Chou concert, where him and "Blue Cat" have also arranged to meet in person. Yuichi runs into Shusuke, who coercively throws away Yuichi's ticket. Yuichi watches the concert outside on a screen and realizes that Shusuke was Blue Cat. Yuichi stabs him in the middle of a crowd after the concert, killing him. 

At home, Yuichi begins his life again, reconciling with his schoolteacher and dyeing his hair. He shares a moment with Kuno as she plays piano. The movie's final scene shows Yuichi, Shusuke, and Tsuda standing alone in a field, listening to the music of Lily Chou-Chou.

Production 

On April 1, 2000, Shunji Iwai went live with his internet novel, in the form of a website called Lilyholic, where he posted messages as several characters on the BBS. Readers of the novel were free to post alongside Iwai's characters and interact with each other, indeed this BBS is where some of the content from the movie comes from. After the main incident in the novel took place, posting was closed and the second phase of the novel started, about the lives of 14-year-olds. (The novel is available on CD-ROM, but only in Japanese.)

Production on the film began in Ashikaga, Tochigi Prefecture on August 13, 2000, and ended on November 28, 2000. It premiered at the Toronto International Film Festival on September 7, 2001, and opened in Japan on October 6, 2001.

Iwai was the first Japanese director to use the, at the time, completely new digital video camera, the Sony HDW-F900 to shoot the film.

It is thought that Iwai was inspired to shoot in digital by his friend, the anime and live-action film director Hideaki Anno, who shot his own digital film entitled Love & Pop, in 1998. Anno later cast Iwai as the lead in his second live-action film, Shiki-Jitsu. After the film's release a synopsis written from the point of view of the main character Yūichi was published online to explain the film's events.

Music
The soundtrack of Lily Chou-Chou was written and arranged by Takeshi Kobayashi, with vocals by the singer Salyu. It features a number of songs that are sung by the fictional rock star Lily Chou-Chou in the film. The soundtrack also makes heavy use of the classical music of Claude Debussy.

In 2010 Salyu and Takeshi Kobayashi released a song under the YouTube name 'LilyChouChou2000', suggesting that the Lily Chou-Chou moniker was still alive.

Cast 
Shugo Oshinari as Shūsuke Hoshino (星野修介 Hoshino Shūsuke), the best student in school who, after a trip to Okinawa, becomes a bully. Posts under the alias Blue Cat (青猫 Ao Neko).
Hayato Ichihara as Yūichi Hasumi (蓮見雄一 Hasumi Yūichi), Shusuke's former friend who becomes a reluctant member of his gang and will later on be bullied by Shusuke. Yūichi is the leading character in the movie. He admins an online Lily Chou-Chou BBS under the alias Philia (フィリア Firia) and is a great fan of the singer.
Ayumi Ito as Yōko Kuno (久野陽子 Kuno Yōko), a classmate of Yūichi's. A brilliant pianist, she is the envy of a clique of powerful girls, and therefore is also bullied. She is raped by Shusuke's gang and cuts off her hair as a way of avoiding Shiori Tsuda's fate.
Yū Aoi as Shiori Tsuda (津田詩織 Tsuda Shiori), a classmate of Yūichi who gets blackmailed into enjo kōsai by Shusuke. Yūichi befriends her later on, and introduces her to Lily's music. Near the end of the movie she takes her life.
Yuki Ito as Kamino, one of the boys in the blue school uniforms at the train station when Yoko is introduced.
Izumi Inamori as Izumi Hoshino (星野いずみ Hoshino Izumi), Shusuke's mother. It is unknown if she is single. She loves her son very much and welcomes Yūichi with open arms during a junior high sleepover at the Hoshino household. A classmate of Yūichi suggests that this is done to ensure that Yūichi will enjoy being Hoshino's friend.
Salyu as Lily Chou-Chou, the enigmatic and ethereal singer that Yūichi, Tsuda and others in the film are fans of. She is hardly seen in the film, except on a video screen near the story's end, but her music is heard throughout the movie. She is said by her fans to channel what is called "the Ether", which is not unlike the invisible substance once thought by ancient philosophers to be the field that light travels through. This "ether" can be heard in the calm, melancholy songs she sings.
Takao Osawa as Takao Tabito
Miwako Ichikawa as Shimabukuro

Details 
Quentin Tarantino used the song "Kaifuku Suru Kizu (Wounds that heal)" from the Lily Chou-Chou soundtrack in Kill Bill, in the scene where the Bride views Hattori Hanzō's sword collection.
The idea of Lily Chou-Chou the rock star was inspired by Faye Wong.
Extras at the concert scene were given an index card with extremely detailed information as to the thought process they should be going through during filming. There were hundreds of extras, partly made up of fans of the internet novel who had BBS meet ups during the day. Posters from the BBS are visible in the background of this scene and can be spotted by watching for clues from their posts.
Ayumi Ito spent weeks training on the piano in order to do all of her scenes without a double. She became so obsessed with Debussy's "Arabesque No. 1" that she made it her cell phone ringtone.
Originally, in the internet novel, Yūichi and Hoshino belong to the track team, not the kendo team.
Debussy wrote his famous Children's Corner Suite (1909) for his beloved daughter whom he nicknamed Chouchou.
The movie's original runtime was 157 minutes, but the original print of the 157 minute version no longer exists because it was burned. The extra 11 minutes was composed of extra and intense footage of the rape scene, a scene with Yūichi on the beach (similar to Hoshino's drowning scene) and an extended funeral scene.

Style
Comparing it to The 400 Blows (1959), Andrew O'Hehir dubbed All About Lily Chou-Chou "sprawling and adventurous [...] [Iwai's] movie has a youthful restlessness, an almost compulsive daring". According to Entertainment Weekly's Lisa Schwarzbaum, Iwai "creates Yuichi’s world as much through disembodied moments of sight and sound as through action". According to Kevin Thomas in Los Angeles Times, the film contains "sweeping juxtapositions of the beautiful and the terrible in both the aural and the visual". After the trip to Okinawa, Shinoda switches to a "restless, jabbing, hand-held camera style [...] for a deliberately unsettling effect."

According to Scott Tobias of The A.V. Club, Iwai aimed to capture the feeling of being a teenager; the writer claimed that it "mimics the aimless, unformed rhythms of adolescent life" by "[d]rifting through time and space without firmly situating the viewer". Michael Atkinson of The Village Voice noted, "Flashbacks are scant signified, and jump cuts leave out massive amounts of motivating incident [...] Iwai prefers to observe from a distance, and he has a taste for disjunctive visuals".

Interpretation
O'Hehir placed the film within the "cinema of globalization" and said that Iwai makes "the oldest possible complaint about modern culture: that as it purports to bring people together it actually keeps them separate". Lily herself never appears in the film, and O'Hehir interpreted her as a symbol for a tranquility that has disappeared from the rapidly changing Japan of the film's universe. While Thomas agreed that the film supports the idea that traditional social structures prevent the rise of disaffected youth, he also wrote that the teens' brutality and allegiance to a sadistic leader strongly resembled the militarism of Japan during World War II.

Atkinson argues that All About Lily Chou-Chou "[mourns] the despoiling tragedies of pre-adulthood and the infuriating inadequacy of nostalgia." Tobias said the film ultimately laments how all the teens are bottling up anger.

Reception
The film has a 69% approval rating on Rotten Tomatoes (based on 39 reviews), and a 73/100 average on Metacritic (based on 18 reviews). Atkinson referred to All About Lily Chou-Chou as "possibly the loveliest film ever shot on high-def video." He argued that the work overly lacks narrative cues, but still wrote that "Iwai fashions pensive cyber-lyricism out of a new generation’s instruments of introversion". O'Hehir praised "its wealth of ideas, its willingness to go anywhere and do anything [...] [Iwai's] lustrous images and the complexity of his portrayal of middle-class Japan in decline". He described it as a "puzzling, intermittently brilliant film".

In The A.V. Club, Scott Tobias wrote, "Iwai's arty self-consciousness takes some getting used to, but as the film slides inexorably toward a devastating third act, it seems to tighten its grasp on the sad, painful remove that governs its young characters' lives." Kevin Thomas wrote a moderately positive review in Los Angeles Times, calling the work "maddeningly hard to follow" but also "profoundly disturbing [...] Iwai’s depiction of what life can be like for far too many teens comes across loud and clear."

Roger Ebert gave the film two stars, dismissing the visual style as "tiresome and pretentious". On the narrative he wrote, "The elements are in place for a powerful story of alienated Japanese teenagers, but [Iwai] cannot bring himself to make the story accessible to ordinary audiences. [...] Some sequences are so incomprehensible they play as complete abstractions." Regarding the comparisons to The 400 Blows, Ebert argued, "Truffaut broke with traditional styles in order to communicate better, not to avoid communicating at all." In 2020, James Marsh of South China Morning Post listed the film as one of the 25 best Japanese films since 2000.

Awards and nominations
2002 Berlin International Film Festival – Panorama (Shunji Iwai)
2002 6th Shanghai International Film Festival – Best Music (Takeshi Kobayashi) and Special Jury Award (Shunji Iwai)

Box office totals

Budget: ¥150,000,000 (US$1,249,656)

Local:
Japan: ¥3,026,188,000 (US$25,211,298)
Opening Week Gross: ¥514,775,000 (US$4,288,612)
Date Released: October 6, 2001
In release: 15.7 weeks

International:
USA: US$26,485 (¥3,179,328)

Rentals:
Japan: ¥810,340,000 (US$6,750,436)

References

External links 
Official site

 Salyu's official site
Fan site 'I Love Lily Chou-Chou'
 
"An Unreal Star Unleashes Real Teenagers' Brutality" -(The New York Times review)

2001 films
Films about juvenile delinquency
Films directed by Shunji Iwai
Japanese coming-of-age films
2000s Japanese-language films
2000s Japanese films